Four Bagatelles is New York City Ballet ballet master Jerome Robbins' only ballet made to the music of Beethoven: Bagatelles, Op. 33, Nos. 4, 5, and 2 (in order of performance) and Bagatelles, Op. 126, No. 4. The premiere took place on Thursday, 10 January 1974 at the New York State Theater, Lincoln Center. The ballet was revived for the 2008 Spring Jerome Robbins celebration.

Original cast
 Gelsey Kirkland
 Jean-Pierre Bonnefoux

References 

  
 NYCBallet website
Playbill, NYCB, Tuesday, June 10, 2008
Playbill, City Center, Wednesday and Thursday, September 30 – October 1, 2009
 
New York City Ballet News, Spring 2008
Repertory Week, NYCB, Spring season, 2008 repertory, week 7

Articles 
Sunday NY Times, Clive Barnes, May 26, 1974

Reviews 

  
NY Times, Anna Kisselgoff, January 12, 1974 
Sunday NY Times, Clive Barnes, February 17, 1974 
Sunday NY Times, Deborah Jowitt, December 8, 1974 
 
NY Times, Alastair Macaulay, June 12, 2008
NY Times, Alastair Macaulay, October 1, 2009

Ballets by Jerome Robbins
Ballets to the music of Ludwig van Beethoven
1974 ballet premieres
New York City Ballet repertory
Fall for Dance 2009 repertory